Wintergreen is a census-designated place (CDP) in Augusta and Nelson counties, Virginia, United States, located near Wintergreen Resort. The population as of the 2010 Census was 165.

River Bluff was listed on the National Register of Historic Places in 1980. Wintergreen is also the name of a large resort community which is 9 miles away. 

References
Virginia Trend Report 2: State and Complete Places (Sub-state 2010 Census Data)

Census-designated places in Augusta County, Virginia
Census-designated places in Nelson County, Virginia